Municipal elections were held in Bosnia and Herzegovina on 2 October 2016.

A total of 3,263,906 voters were registered in the Central Voters’ Register, including 65,111 by-mail voters. Around 25,000 citizens voted at polling stations in diplomatic representations abroad.

30,000 candidates were contesting the election for 2,835 local councillors, 301 city councillors, 131 municipal mayors and 12 city majors.

The Central Electoral Commission registered a total of 3,179,720 persons eligible to vote (excluding Stolac); 1,739,756 votes were cast, of which 1,635,602 (94.01%) valid, and 104,154 (5.99%) invalid.

Summary

Local elections took place in a rather heated political environment, being preceded by one week by an illegal referendum in the Republika Srpska entity on the 9 January holiday, which had been declared unconstitutional by the Constitutional Court. Although the same Court declared the referendum null and void, it took place equally. The political discourse in the pre-electoral period focus on ethno-national issues rather than local administration.

Voting took place regularly and without major incidents. For the first time, a 40% gender quota was applied to candidate lists; however, only seven women were elected as mayor out of 143. 
Some irregularities in the electoral process were reported, including as regards inflated voters' lists and the politicisation of electoral administration. No elections could be held in Mostar, for the second time in a row. Elections in Stolac were suspending following violent incidents and later repeated on 19 February.

Results

Federation of Bosnia and Herzegovina

By municipality

By party

Republika Srpska

By municipality

By party

Assembly of Brčko District

References

External links 

 Council of Europe, Congress of Local and Regional Authorities, Observation of local elections in Bosnia and Herzegovina, 2016 - Report CG32(2017)16final

Elections in Bosnia and Herzegovina
Bosnian municipal elections
Municipal
Municipal elections in Bosnia and Herzegovina
Bosnian municipal elections